Jeremy Bates may refer to:

 Jeremy Bates (American football) (born 1976), American football coach
 Jeremy Bates (boxer) (born 1974), American boxer
 Jeremy Bates (tennis) (born 1962), British tennis player  
 Jeremy Bates (author) (born 1978), Canadian/Australian author